Love Song is an album by saxophonist Gary Bartz released by the Vee-Jay label in 1977.

Reception

AllMusic reviewer Scott Yanow stated "A reasonably enjoyable but not essential release, this album features altoist Gary Bartz (doubling on soprano) performing some originals and older R&B tunes with a four-piece rhythm section ... The music overall is generally danceable and funky, sounding a bit dated despite some decent solos. Not Gary Bartz's worst (from a jazz standpoint), but also far from his best".

Track listing
 "Love Song" (Gary Bartz) – 6:35
 "Prelude and Lonely Girl" (Leon Carr, Earl Shuman) – 5:50
 "Interlude and Don't Stop Now" (Eddie Holman, James Soloman) – 6:55
"You" (Jeffrey Bowen, Jack Goga, Ivy Jo Hunter) – 7:35
 "Interlude and Just Suppose" (George Cables) – 8:55
 "Afterthoughts" (Bartz) – 1:30

Personnel
Gary Bartz – alto saxophone, soprano saxophone, vocals
George Cables – keyboards
Carl McDaniels – guitar
Curtis Robertson – bass
Howard King – drums
Rita Greene – lead vocals (tracks 1 & 5)

References

1977 albums
Gary Bartz albums
Vee-Jay Records albums